Michael or Mike Brennan may refer to:

 Michael Brennan (actor) (1912–1982), English film and television actor
 Michael Brennan (footballer) (born 1965), former Australian rules footballer
 Michael Brennan (field hockey) (born 1975), Australian field hockey player
 Michael Brennan (finance) (born 1942), American finance professor
 Michael Brennan (Fine Gael politician) (1884–1970), Irish Cumann na nGaedhael and (later) Fine Gael TD
 Michael Brennan (ice hockey) (born 1986), American professional ice hockey player
 Michael Brennan (Lieutenant-General) (1896–1986), Irish Defence Forces Chief of Staff 1931–1940
 Michael Brennan (photographer) (born 1943), British photographer
 Michael Brennan (Progressive Democrats politician) (born 1946), Irish Progressive Democrat Senator
 Michael Brennan (poet) (born 1973), Australian poet
 Michael Brennan Jr., record producer of songs as "Ask Me How I Am" and "One Night Is Not Enough"
 Michael B. Brennan (born 1963), American lawyer and United States federal judge
 Michael F. Brennan (born 1953), mayor of Portland and Maine state senator 
 Mike Brennan (basketball) (born 1972), American college basketball head coach
 Mike Brennan (American football) (born 1967), American football tackle

See also
 Mick Brennan (born 1950), Irish hurler
 Mick Brennan (alpine skier) (born 1979), English skier
 Micka Brennan (1914–1987), Irish hurler